Pascal Kleiman (born 19 April 1968) is a French DJ based in Valencia, Spain, who also produced music as DJ RamBam.

Career 

Born in Toulouse, Kleiman started in the world of music from the explosion of French free radio during the 1980s. With his radio program Virus, he showcased independent underground punk and funk with the likes of ESG, Liquid Liquid, and early electronic beats of A Split-Second and Front 242.

Kleiman studied law in Toulouse, but in 1989, with the revolution of the acid house movement, Kleiman found his calling as a DJ and record producer performing and creating music for the first rave parties in France. In 1992, he took on his first artist residency at a nightclub in Madrid called club "Attica". He soon moved to Valencia in 1993 where he has been playing a few times at N.O.D. alongside Kike Jaen.

In 1996, he created the record label "UV" to produce alternative artists in the electronic music scene in Valencia, Spain.

Born without arms or hands due to Distilbene he is known by many as "The Amazing Pascal", or "The DJ who spins with his feet",

He plays a mixture of ambient, dub, progressive, and psychedelic electronic music from European, South African, American and Asian artists. Owning his record shop gives him access in the latest electronic dance music.

A DJ since 1989, he has played the best clubs and festivals worldwide including Space Ibiza, Barraca, Chocolate, NOD, ACTV in Valencia, Attica, Specka, La Riviera in Madrid, Les Nuits Fauves, Rex Club in Paris, Block in Tel Aviv as well as others in Italia, Portugal, Nederland, Belgium, Germany, Russia, and India.

He worked as a DJ between 2000 and 2010 at the festival Apokalypsa (Czech Republic), at the Festival Phonotica in Asturias (Spain), the Sonar festival Barcelona, and at La Notte Bianca Lecce (Italy). He has shared the stage with Jeff Mills, Laurent Garnier, Derrick May, Jerome Sydenham, Maurice Fullton, Jon Cutler, Dj Garth, Christian Varela, and Titonton Duvante among others.

As a DJ at Desert Advanture in Israel from 2006 to 2011, he shared the stage with Darwish, Perfect stranger, and U-Recken among others.

He has been a DJ for the social integration of persons with disabilities in many events from associations in Spain, Nederland, and Russia as well as UNICEF in Paris.

He is a current or former artist on the following labels: Incense Records, Psylove Records, AOA, 2Real, Click On Music, and SoTrincha Recordings. He is also the director of Big Foot Records.

Pascal Kleiman was the subject of Angel Loza's 2008 documentary film Héroes. No hacen falta alas para volar, which was nominated for a Goya Award in the Best Short Documentary category.

Discography 
2007 – Konichiwa Pascal Kleiman & Jose Caparos – Age of Aquarius
2007 – Empty Your Mind Pascal Kleiman & Psycho Abstract – Psylove
2007 – Heroes, Nothing is Impossible – Short movie about Pascal Kleiman
2006 – Psylove Pascal Kleiman & Psycho Abstract – Psylove
1997 – Double LP Amelia, Over the Age – Underground Valencia
1997 – Abstrax Elements of Art – Underground Valencia
1997 – Electric Reverting Elements of Art – Underground Valencia
1996 – Escalator Age of Aquarious – Prodisk
1996 – Tecnicidad Club House – Prodisk
1995 – Aerial Age of Aquarious – Prodisk
1996 – Rhythm Sex Prodigy – Prodisk edited by Pirate Records

Activities

Clubs in Spain 
Latex – a one-year Artist residency

Also at: La Real, La Florida, Chocolate, ACTV, Puzzle, Barraca, Pachá, Space, Radical, Mogambo, RDC, Repvblica, 69 Monos, El Peach, La Macarena, Tito's, DC 10, Sala 4 and many more...

Played with 
Laurent Garnier in Rex Club, Paris and Barraca, Valencia
DJ Garth (Grayhound Recordings) in Sala 4, Valencia
Maurice Fullton in 69 Monos, Valencia
John Cutler (Distant Music) in Phonotica, Asturias
Titonton Duvante (Residual Records) in Latex, Valencia
Ellie Kleiman of Ohio (his sister) (Residual Records, in Cincinnati)
Mekanika, CPU and Alex Tolstey in Barraca
VJ Kyle Lyons (VJ LOOPS), Valencia

Residencies 
Latex Community (Spain)
Tribe of Frogs (UK)
Misa de 8 (Spain)

Festivals 
Sónar, Barcelona
Fonótica, Asturias
Musica di Estratti – Lecce, Italy

Projects and shows 
Tienes Talento TV show on Cuatro (channel) (Spain)

Owner 
1997 – Love Sonico/ Love Wear – Local Valencian underground clothing and record shop
2006 – Psylove – Carrying underground clothing, records, CDs and VJ/DJ equipment
2007 – Audio/Visual School – classes for DJs and VJs (Psylove, 3rd floor)

References

External links 
 

1968 births
Living people
French composers
French male composers
Spanish composers
Spanish male composers
Spanish dance musicians
Eurodisco musicians
Goa trance musicians
French DJs
Spanish DJs
Club DJs
French record producers
French trance musicians
French psychedelic trance musicians
French house musicians
People without hands
Musicians from Toulouse
Amputee musicians
Electronic dance music DJs